Daniel Petermann (born October 4, 1995) is a professional Canadian football wide receiver for the BC Lions of the Canadian Football League (CFL).

University career
Petermann played U Sports football for the McMaster Marauders from 2014 to 2017. In 2014, he was named the OUA Rookie of the year where he played in eight regular season games and had 35 receptions for 468 yards and four touchdowns. He also played in the team's 50th Vanier Cup loss to the Montreal Carabins where he had ten catches for 66 yards.

Professional career

Winnipeg Blue Bombers
Petermann was drafted in the third round, 26th overall, in the 2018 CFL Draft by the Winnipeg Blue Bombers and was signed on May 14, 2018. He made the team's opening day roster and played in his first professional game on June 14, 2018, against the Edmonton Eskimos. Petermann scored his first touchdown on a nine-yard reception from Chris Streveler in the Banjo Bowl on September 8, 2018. In his rookie season, he played in all 18 regular season games and recorded 10 receptions for 154 yards and one touchdown.

In 2019, Petermann again played in all 18 regular season games and had 15 catches for 118 yards and one touchdown. He also played in all three post-season games that year and won his first Grey Cup championship as the Blue Bombers won the 107th Grey Cup. The 2020 CFL season was cancelled and he became a free agent in 2021.

Ottawa Redblacks
On February 10, 2021, Petermann signed with the Ottawa Redblacks. He played in ten regular season games with the team where he had 16 catches for 148 yards and two touchdowns. He became a free agent when his contract expired on February 8, 2022.

BC Lions
On February 8, 2022, it was announced that Petermann had signed with the BC Lions.

References

External links
BC Lions bio 

1995 births
Living people
Canadian football wide receivers
Sportspeople from Hamilton, Ontario
Players of Canadian football from Ontario
McMaster Marauders football players
Winnipeg Blue Bombers players
Ottawa Redblacks players
BC Lions players